Bratyabrata Basu Roy Chowdhury (born 25 September 1969), also known as Bratya Basu, is an Indian actor, stage director, playwright, film director, professor and a politician who is serving as the current Education Minister of West Bengal since 2021. He also assumed the same office in First Mamata Banerjee ministry. In May 2016, Basu was assigned the portfolios of Tourism, Science Technology and Bio-Technology, Information Technology and Electronics . He has been elected as an MLA, from the Dum Dum constituency since 2011 Assembly Election of West Bengal. Bratya Basu is presently the Chairperson of prestigious Paschimbanga Bangla Akademi and Minerva Natyasanskriti Charchakendra under the governance of the Department of Information and Cultural Affairs, West Bengal.

Early life
Bratya Basu was born in Calcutta to Professor Dr. Bishnu Basu and Educational Administrator Dr. Neetika Basu. His early name was Bratyabrata Basu Roy Chowdhury. He belongs to the "Basu Roy Chowdhury" family of Ulpur (now in Faridpur, Bangladesh). After doing his graduation in Bengali from the Presidency College [Currently Presidency University, Kolkata], he completed his Post Graduation from the University of Calcutta.

Career
Bratya Basu started his career as a sound operator for the theatre group Ganakrishti and soon started writing and directing plays with the group. The themes of his writings focus on political fantasy, nature-human relationships, connection between music and life, ethical values and its lack, conflict between love and revolt, bonding between time and culture.
Bratya Basu joined City College, Kolkata as an assistant professor in the department of Bengali.  He launched his career as a dramatist with the play Ashaleen (1996), described by theatre critics as the first postmodernist Bengali play. His noted plays thereafter include Aranyadeb, Shahar Yaar, Virus-M, Winkle-Twinkle, etc. These plays are not only popular but also unique in different genres of modern literary theatre and subject to manifold interpretations. His other important plays include Ruddhasangeet, Chatushkon, Hemlat - the Prince of Garanhata, Krishna Gahobar, Sateroi July, Bikele Bhorer Sorshey Phool, Supari Killer, Boma etc. A compilation of his plays has been published in four volumes in 2004, 2010, 2016 and in 2022 respectively. He has even directed four films - Raasta which has a theme of youth moving into terrorism, Teesta a film on society and the failure of romance, Tara and Dictionary and acted in many films which include Kaalbela, Icchey, Sthaniyo Sambad, Hemlock Society, Muktodhara, Double Feluda, Baranda, Jogajog, Kalkijug, Asamapta, Dhulobali Katha etc. Basu has bagged many awards and recognition. Some of them include the Shambhu Mitra Samman 2016, conferred by Rajdanga Dyotak, Shrestha Natya Nirman 2017, conferred by Anya Theatre, Khaled Choudhury Samman 2017, conferred by Abhash, Dakshin Kolkata, Shilpayan Samman 2017, conferred by Gobordanga Shilpayan, Sumati Sengupta Smriti Samman 2019, conferred by Angan Belghoria, Dronacharya Samman 2019, conferred by Ashoknagar Natyamukh and the prestigious Satyen Mitra Smriti Puroshkar awarded by Theatre Workshop in 2001, 2003, 2004 and 2017 for his exemplary contribution in Bengali Theatre. He has also been awarded Gajendra Kumar Mitra-Sumathanath Ghosh Memorial Award 2018, conferred by Mitra & Ghosh Publishers Pvt. Ltd. for his contribution in Bengali Literature.

In 2021, Bratya Basu has been conferred with Sahitya Akademi Award, the most prestigious award of the country for outstanding works of literature, for his anthology of Bengali theatre, Mir Jafar O Onyanya Natak (a compilation of three plays - Mir Jafar, Ekdin Aladin and Ami Anukulda aar Ora). The award is given by an autonomous organisation of Government of India, Ministry of Culture.

Hemlat, The Prince of Garanhata has won the critical acclaims from academic researchers for the adaptation. Sam Kolodezh of the University of California, Irvine, Drama and theatre heaped praise on Bratya's adaptation. Formerly Associate Professor, Kuwait University and a Life-member of Shakespeare Society of Eastern India, Antony Johae is so moved by the contemporary Indianization of Shakespear's mastertext that he lectured across India on Hemlat. Mr. Johae has contributed a research paper on Hemlat in the Vol-V, No.VIII of The International Journal of Cultural Studies and Social Sciences, edited by Dr Prof Amitava Roy., formerly Shakespeare Professor of Rabindra Bharati University and president and co founder of Shakespeare Society of Eastern India and Prof Ronan Paterson., an actor, director and a producer for theatre, film in Britain and Ireland and an extensive writer on Shakespeare.

Bratya Basu has created his own space in contemporary theatre by moving beyond its existing boundaries. He has formed the theatre group Kalindi Bratyajon in 2008. The first theatrical production of Bratyajon was Ruddhasangeet (2009), a play on the Rabindrasangeet exponent Debabrata Biswas's journey of bitter struggle throughout his life in the prevailing system. The play received instant critical and popular acclaim and has so far staged more than a record 150 shows to packed houses. After producing "Boma" in 2015, a period piece that rips off the masks of the Bengali freedom fighters which reveals jealousies, greed for power and internal conflicts Basu has interestingly produced another untold history of Bengal spanning 1757 and 1764. The play, "Mir Jafar" showcases the power politics and game of minds to unravel the complexities in which 'Mir Jafar' continues to retain the emblematic representation and throne of the 'Universal betrayer' in all societies in all times.

Theaterography

Plays Written by Bratya Basu

Plays Directed by Bratya Basu

Plays Bratya Basu Acted

Bibliography

Books Written by Bratya Basu

Novel Written by Bratya Basu

Original Poetry by Bratya Basu

Books Edited by Bratya Basu

Translated Books of Bratya Basu

Books Written on Bratya Basu

Filmography

Directorial Venture

Films Bratya Basu Acted

TV Series Bratya Basu Acted

Awards and recognitions

Theatre

Cinema

Political career
Bratya Basu won the West Bengal Assembly polls in 2011 on a Trinamool Congress ticket against a CPI(M) Minister, Gautam Deb from the Dum Dum (Vidhan Sabha constituency). He was made Minister for Higher Education in Mamata Banerjee's cabinet. He decided to launch a survey to get a correct picture of the state's higher education situation. Basu has been brought back as Education Minister after Trinamool Congress's thumping win at 2021 Assembly Election.

References

Living people
Presidency University, Kolkata alumni
University of Calcutta alumni
Academic staff of the University of Calcutta
Bengali Hindus
21st-century Bengalis
20th-century Bengalis
Dramatists and playwrights from West Bengal
21st-century Indian film directors
Indian film directors
Indian male actors
Film directors from West Bengal
Trinamool Congress politicians from West Bengal
West Bengal politicians
1969 births
Bengali theatre personalities
Bengali male actors
State cabinet ministers of West Bengal
Academic staff of City College, Kolkata
West Bengal MLAs 2016–2021
Male actors from Kolkata